Bhadrachalam is a census town in Bhadradri Kothagudem district in the Indian state of Telangana. It is an important Hindu pilgrimage town with the Bhadrachalam Temple of Lord Rama, situated on the banks of Godavari river.

History 
The town has a documented history of Lord Sri Rama temple constructed circa 17th century CE by Kancherla Gopanna.

Gopanna (1620 - 1680), popularly known as Bhadradri Ramadasu or Bhadrachala Ramadasu, was a 17th-century Indian devotee of Rama and a composer of Carnatic music. His devotional lyrics to Rama are famous in South Indian classical music as Ramadaasu Keertanalu, and have made Bhadrachalam a place of religious importance for Hindus.

Bhadrachalam area also has several Hindu temples connected with epic Ramayana. It is referred as "Dakshina Saketa Puri" in the movie "Sri Ramadasu".

Geography 
It has an average elevation of 50 metres (164 feet). The zero feet gauge level of Godavari River at Bhadracham is equal to +32.6 m msl.

Demographics 
 India census, Bhadrachalam had a population of 55,352. As of 2001, Males constitute 50% of the population and females 50%. Bhadrachalam has an average literacy rate of 73%, higher than the national average of 59.5%. 11% of the population is under 6 years of age.

Transport 
The state bus service TSRTC operates a bus station in Bhadrachalam connecting the town to various places of the state. Andhra Pradesh state bus service APSRTC operates buses frequently to Bhadrachalam.

The nearest railway station is Bhadrachalam Road railway station,  from the town.

Bhadrachalam is connected to Hyderabad, Khammam, Suryapet, Nalgonda, Warangal, Nizamabad, Ramagundam, Godavarikhani, Miryalaguda, and Karimnagar cities in Telangana state as well as to Rajamahendravaram, Kakinada, Amalapuram, Guntur, Vijayawada and Visakhapatnam in Andhra Pradesh.

References

External links 

Cities and towns in Bhadradri Kothagudem district
Mandals in Bhadradri Kothagudem district